Praxis is a genus of moths of the family Noctuidae. The genus was erected by Achille Guenée in 1852.

Species
 Praxis aterrima Walker, 1856
 Praxis difficilis Walker, [1858]
 Praxis dirigens Walker, 1858
 Praxis edwardsii Guenée, 1852
 Praxis limbatis Strand, 1924
 Praxis marmarinopa Meyrick, 1897
 Praxis pandesma Lower, 1902
 Praxis porphyretica Guenée, 1852

References

Calpinae
Moth genera